Carzino is an Italian surname. Notable people with the surname include:

Enrico Carzino (1897–1965), Italian footballer
Ercole Carzino (1901–1980), Italian footballer, son of Enrico
 (1926–2010), Italian footballer

Italian-language surnames